The Uvidunda Mountains are a mountain range in Tanzania, in Tanzania's Morogoro Region. They are named for the Vidunda people.

Geography
The Uvidunda mountains are part of the Eastern Arc Mountains. The range consists of a single block with three distinct peaks, Chonwe, Mgwila, and Migomberama, which exceed 1500 meters elevation. The Rubeho Mountains are close to the northwest, and the Udzungwa Mountains are immediately to the southwest across the Great Ruaha River. Southeast of the mountains the Great Ruaha river emerges onto a plain. Malundwe Mountain lies to the east in Mikumi National Park. The Mkata Plain opens to the northeast.

Ecology
The mountains are covered in miombo woodland at lower elevations, and evergreen Eastern Arc forests at higher elevations. The remaining forests are generally limited to the valleys, likely due to extensive forest burning and land clearance for agriculture.

A 2006 survey found that the largest intact forest block was the Iyunji (aka Chonwe) forest near the villages of Vidunda, Chonwe, and Udunghu. Based on satellite and ground observations, it was estimated that the forest has been reduced from 471.3 ha in 1975 to 356 ha in 2006, a reduction of nearly 25%. Larger areas of relatively intact open woodland and bushland were found in the western part of the mountains. Large areas of the mountains had been cleared for agriculture, and much of the remaining woodland and bushland was degraded from excessive burning and timber harvesting.

No forest or nature reserves have been designated in the Uvidunda Mountains, although the government has listed Chonwe forest as a 'suggested' forest reserve. A 2011 assessment of priorities for new or expanded protected areas in Tanzania ranked the Uvidunda Mountains as  medium priority among the 27 areas assessed.

References

Eastern Arc forests
Eastern Arc Mountains
Eastern miombo woodlands
Geography of Morogoro Region
Mountain ranges of Tanzania